Liolaemus balagueri is a species of lizard in the family  Liolaemidae. It is native to Peru.

References

balagueri
Reptiles described in 2020
Reptiles of Peru
Taxa named by Cristian Simón Abdala